A convection oven (also known as a fan-assisted oven or simply a fan oven) is an oven that has fans to circulate air around food to create an evenly heated environment. The increased air circulation causes a fan-assisted oven to cook food faster than a conventional non-fan oven, which relies only on natural convection to circulate the hot air. Fan-assisted convection ovens are commonly used for baking as well as non-food, industrial applications.  Small countertop convection ovens for household use are often marketed as air fryers.

In the context of ovens, the term "convection" is widely used to mean "fan-assisted", but this is perhaps not the most precise way to differentiate fan-assisted ovens from conventional ovens, since both types of oven cook using convective heat transfer (transfer of heat due to the bulk movement of hot air).
Conventional ovens circulate hot air using natural convection and fan-assisted ovens circulate hot air using forced convection, so scientifically the term "convection" applies equally to both conventional (natural convection) ovens and fan-assisted (forced convection) ovens.

Culinary convection ovens
Convection ovens distribute heat evenly around the food, removing the blanket of cooler air that surrounds food when it is first placed in an oven and allowing food to cook more evenly in less time and at a lower temperature than in a conventional oven.

History 

The first oven with a fan to circulate air was invented in 1914 but it was never launched commercially.

The first convection oven in wide use was the Maxson Whirlwind Oven, invented in 1945.

Design 

A convection oven has a fan with a heating element around it. A small fan circulates the air in the cooking chamber.

One effect of the fan is to reduce the thickness of the stationary thermal boundary layer of cooler air that naturally forms around the food. The boundary layer acts as an insulator and slows the rate that the heat reaches the food. By moving the cool air (convecting it) away from the food the layer is thinned, and cooking occurs faster. In addition, because the air gets well mixed, the oven has a very even temperature.

Convection ovens may include radiant heat sources at the top and bottom of the oven, which improves heat transfer and speeds cooking from initial cold start. On the other hand, some ovens have all the heating elements placed in an outside enclosure and hidden from the food. This reduces the effect of radiant heat on the food; however, the walls of the oven will also be heated by the circulating hot air, and though the resulting temperature is much lower than that of a radiant heat source, it is still hot enough to provide some heating of the food by radiation from the walls.

Effectiveness 

A convection oven allows a reduction in cooking temperature compared to a conventional oven. This comparison will vary, depending on factors including, for example, how much food is being cooked at once or if airflow is being restricted, for example by an oversized baking tray. This difference in cooking temperature is offset as the circulating air transfers heat more quickly than still air of the same temperature. In order to transfer the same amount of heat in the same time, the temperature must be lowered to reduce the rate of heat transfer in order to compensate.

Product testing of toaster ovens has demonstrated no notable advantages to convection cooking over conventional toasting or baking.

Variants 
Another form of a convection oven is called an impingement oven. This type of oven is often used to cook pizzas and lightly toast bread in restaurants, but it can also be used for other foods. Impingement ovens have a high flow rate of hot air from both above and below the food. The air flow is directed onto food that usually passes through the oven on a conveyor belt.

Impingement ovens can achieve a much higher heat transfer than a conventional oven, and fully enclosed models can also use dual magnetrons, like a microwave oven. The most notable manufacturer of this type of oven is Turbochef. The differences between an impingement oven (with magnetrons) and a convection microwave oven are cost, power consumption, and speed. Impingement ovens are designed to be used in restaurants, where speed is essential and power consumption and cost are less of a concern.

There are also convection microwave ovens which combine a convection oven with a microwave oven to cook food with the speed of a microwave oven and the browning ability of a convection oven.

An air fryer is a smaller countertop oven that also circulates hot air through the oven, but an air fryer uses a higher rate of air flow (which for example can be measured in cubic meters per second or liters per second).

A combi steamer is an oven that combines convection functionality with superheated steam to cook foods even faster and retain more nutrients and moisture.

Industrial convection ovens
Industrial convection ovens can be very large-sized and are typically used for manufacturing various items.

See hot air oven for ovens to sterilize medical equipment.

References

See also
 Convective heat transfer

Ovens
Convection
20th-century inventions